La Sibilla is a bimonthly word puzzle magazine (six issues per year) founded in Naples in 1975 by Guido Iazzetta. The editorial staff is at present composed of Edgardo Bellini (nickname Edgar), Alessandro Cassani (L'Incas), Rosanna Gastaldi (Pratolina), Maria Maraviglia (Malia) and Giuseppe Sangalli (Pipino il Breve).

The magazine employs several illustrators, among them Alfredo Baroni, Roberto Mangosi, Sandro Mosca, Giorgio Noliani, Simona Simone, and Enrico Viceconte. 

The name is based on the famous Cumaean Sibyl, a legendary woman with prophetic powers, who according to tradition lived in a cave near Cumae. The Sibyl expressed her prophecies in a cryptic way, for which reason she has always been associated with the idea of mystery and enigmas.

Monthly from 1975 to 1978, then bimonthly, the magazine has so far published 32 supplements (Quaderni della Sibilla) and is one of the longest established puzzle magazines ever published in Italy.

Among many other word puzzles, La Sibilla publishes works in poetic form (either long and with a serious subject, or short and witty called epigrammatici) that are in fact puzzles alluding through hidden double meanings to a different subject, which must be found besides the apparent meaning (see riddle). It also publishes cryptic puzzles, rebuses, technical articles about word puzzles and, more generally, wordplay (in Italian Ludolinguistica).

The magazine is widely appreciated thanks to the works of expert word puzzle writers and the occasional contribution of famous personalities like Stefano Bartezzaghi, Umberto Eco, Nicola Piovani, Roberto Vecchioni, Francesco Guccini and Paolo Conte.

La Sibilla subscribers, specialists in the field of word puzzles, amateurs and enthusiasts, can participate in a yearly meeting (Festa della Sibilla) which takes place every June at Marina di Massa (Tuscany).

External links

1975 establishments in Italy
Bi-monthly magazines published in Italy
Magazines published in Italy
Monthly magazines published in Italy
Magazines established in 1975
Puzzle magazines
Italian-language magazines
Mass media in Naples